The 2018 British Indoor Athletics Championships was held on 17 and 18 February 2018 at the Arena Birmingham in Birmingham, England. The event served as the team trials for the 2018 IAAF World Indoor Championships.

Medal summary

Men

Women

References
UK Athletics - SPAR British Athletics Indoor Championships Saturday 17th February - Sunday 18th February 2018 

British Indoor Championships
British Indoor Athletics Championships
Sports competitions in Birmingham, West Midlands
Athletics Indoor
Athletics competitions in England